Sublette is a city in and the county seat of Haskell County, Kansas, United States.  As of the 2020 census, the population of the city was 1,413.

History
Sublette was founded in 1912. It was named for William Lewis Sublette, a French Huguenot who was a partner in the Rocky Mountain Fur Company. Sublette was a mountain man, fur trapper and pioneer who blazed a trail through the area and was known by the local natives as "Cut Face".

The first post office in Sublette was established in January 1913.

Geography
Sublette is located at  (37.479660, -100.845034).

Climate
According to the Köppen Climate Classification system, Sublette has a semi-arid climate, abbreviated "BSk" on climate maps.

Demographics

2010 census
As of the census of 2010, there were 1,453 people, 556 households, and 409 families residing in the city. The racial makeup of the city was 85.1% White, 0.1% African American, 1.0% Native American, 0.1% Asian, 11.8% from other races, and 2.0% from two or more races. Hispanic or Latino of any race were 26.8% of the population.

There were 556 households, of which 38.3% had children under the age of 18 living with them, 61.0% were married couples living together, 8.1% had a female householder with no husband present, 4.5% had a male householder with no wife present, and 26.4% were non-families. 24.3% of all households were made up of individuals, and 11.4% had someone living alone who was 65 years of age or older. The average household size was 2.61 and the average family size was 3.09.

The median age in the city was 36.9 years. 28.8% of residents were under the age of 18; 7.6% were between the ages of 18 and 24; 23.5% were from 25 to 44; 27.9% were from 45 to 64; and 12.2% were 65 years of age or older. The gender makeup of the city was 49.7% male and 50.3% female.

2000 census
As of the census of 2000, there were 1,592 people, 574 households, and 441 families residing in the city. The racial makeup of the city was 84.61% White, 0.19% African American, 0.82% Native American, 0.88% Asian, 10.99% from other races, and 2.51% from two or more races. Hispanic or Latino of any race were 21.36% of the population.

There were 574 households, out of which 41.1% had children under the age of 18 living with them, 67.2% were married couples living together, 7.3% had a female householder with no husband present, and 23.0% were non-families. 20.9% of all households were made up of individuals, and 10.8% had someone living alone who was 65 years of age or older. The average household size was 2.77 and the average family size was 3.22.

In the city, the population was spread out, with 32.0% under the age of 18, 8.2% from 18 to 24, 26.5% from 25 to 44, 22.2% from 45 to 64, and 11.1% who were 65 years of age or older. The median age was 33 years. For every 100 females, there were 102.0 males. For every 100 females age 18 and over, there were 97.3 males.

The median income for a household in the city was $40,161, and the median income for a family was $43,167. Males had a median income of $33,611 versus $22,708 for females. The per capita income for the city was $17,787. About 7.8% of families and 12.1% of the population were below the poverty line, including 18.7% of those under age 18 and 9.1% of those age 65 or over.

Media

Print
The Haskell County Monitor-Chief is the local newspaper.

Radio
Currently there are no radio station(s) licensed to Sublette.

Television
Sublette is in the Wichita-Hutchinson, Kansas television market. 
KDGL-LD is licensed to Sublette Kansas and is the flagship station of High Plains Broadcasting, LLC.  KDGL broadcasts on RF channel 23 carrying 6 video streams.  Current Networks are Retro TV, Tuff TV, AMG TV, Launch TV, TheWalk TV, and PBJ TV.  KDGL uses TV23 as branding for all 5 licenses including Dodge City, Garden City, Liberal, and Ulysses.  Sublette was chosen for its central location in the Southwest Kansas Market and to streamline future news gathering for NewsWest23 newscasts.

Notable people
 Jack Christiansen, Hall of Fame football player for the Detroit Lions
 Shalee Lehning, former professional basketball player for the Atlanta Dream, and associate head coach on the Northern Colorado women's basketball team
 Otto Schnellbacher, (1923-2008), played both basketball and football (American) professionally
 Ted Trimpa, Democratic strategist and political consultant

References

Further reading

External links

 City of Sublette
 Sublette - Directory of Public Officials
 USD 374, local school district
 Sublette city map, KDOT

Cities in Kansas
County seats in Kansas
Cities in Haskell County, Kansas